William Chetwood (June 17, 1771 – December 17, 1857) was a U.S. Representative from New Jersey. He was the Mayor of Elizabethtown, New Jersey from 1839 to 1841.

Early life
Chetwood was born on June 17, 1771 in Elizabeth, New Jersey. He was a son of John Chetwood, an attorney, and Mary (née Emott) Chetwood (d. 1786). His elder sister, Elizabeth Chetwood, was the wife of Aaron Ogden, a U.S. Senator who also served as the 5th Governor of New Jersey.

He graduated from Princeton College in 1792, where he studied law. He was admitted to the bar in 1796 and commenced practice in Elizabeth, New Jersey.

Career
He served as prosecutor of the pleas for Essex County, became a member of the State Council of New Jersey, was a major of militia and served in the Whiskey Rebellion of 1794 as aide-de-camp to Major General Henry "Light Horse Harry" Lee.

Chetwood was elected as a Whig (at the time, a coalition of National Republican Party members) to the Twenty-fourth Congress to fill the vacancy caused by the resignation of Philemon Dickerson. He served in Congress from December 5, 1836 to March 3, 1837, afterward resuming the practice of law. In 1841 and 1842 he was elected to the New Jersey Legislative Council from Essex County, New Jersey.

Personal life
Chetwood was married to Mary Barber (1780–1873), a daughter of Anna ( Edwards) Barber and Col. Francis Barber, who served in the Revolutionary War. Together, they were the parents of:

 Matilda Maria Chetwood (1811–1899), who married William Gedney Bull, a wealthy merchant engaged in the "China trade".

He died on December 17, 1857 in Elizabeth, New Jersey at the age of 86. He was interred in Hillside's Evergreen Cemetery.

Descendants
Through his daughter Matilda, who lived at 3 East 9th Street in Manhattan, he was a grandfather of Hetty Bull (1946-1906), who married John Cuming Beatty, and had three children, including Sir Alfred Chester Beatty, the American-British mining magnate.

References

External links

 CHETWOOD, William 1771–1857

1771 births
1857 deaths
People from Elizabeth, New Jersey
People of colonial New Jersey
National Republican Party members of the United States House of Representatives from New Jersey
New Jersey Whigs
Members of the New Jersey Legislative Council
Mayors of Elizabeth, New Jersey
Princeton University alumni
Burials at Evergreen Cemetery (Hillside, New Jersey)